Monroe is a small unincorporated community in Lauramie Township, Tippecanoe County, in the U.S. state of Indiana. The community is part of the Lafayette, Indiana Metropolitan Statistical Area.

History
A post office was established under the name Huntersville in 1836; it was renamed Monroe in 1840, and remained in operation until it was discontinued in 1853.

Monroe originally included three northwest/southeast streets (Darlington, Main, and Patterson) and three northeast/southwest streets (Fayette, Columbia, and Lauramie).

Geography
Monroe is located at 40°17'14" North, 86°44'07" West (40.287222, -86.735278) in Lauramie Township and has an elevation of approximately 785 feet. The town sits in open farmland about 10 miles southeast of the city of Lafayette at the intersection of US Route 52 and County Road 900 South. Monroe Cemetery sits on the west side of town, and Lauramie Creek flows westward just to the south.

References

Unincorporated communities in Tippecanoe County, Indiana
Unincorporated communities in Indiana
Lafayette metropolitan area, Indiana